Wrongful Meeting (Korean: 잘못된 만남; RR: Jalmosdoen Mannam) is the third studio album by South Korean singer Kim Gun-mo, released on January 21, 1995. The record spawned the title track of the same name, which is considered one of the biggest hits in South Korea during the 1990s. The album held the record for biggest selling album in South Korea for 24 years, with sales of over 3.3 million copies.

Background and release 
Wrongful Meeting was released through the Line Production agency in January 1995. The record contains various genres including dance, reggae, hip-hop, jazz and funk as well as ballad, and a cappella tracks.

Reception 
On March 10, 1995, Wrongful Meeting surpassed sales of over 2 million copies. That May, the album was recorded as the best-selling album in South Korea and was included in the Guinness Book of Records in Korea, selling over 2.57 million copies. Because of its huge popularity in South Korea, Japanese newspaper Japan Express named "Wrongful Meeting" one of the top 5 products from South Korea during 1995.

Accolades

Awards 
On domestic music programs, "Wrongful Meeting" received 13 music show awards from March to April 1995, including 5 wins on KBS, 6 wins on SBS, and 2 wins on MBC.

Critic lists

Track listing

References

See also 

 List of best-selling albums in South Korea

1995 albums
Korean-language albums
Grand Prize Golden Disc Award-winning albums